Epectaptera is a genus of moths in the subfamily Arctiinae. The genus was erected by George Hampson in 1898.

Species
 Epectaptera discalis Schaus, 1905
 Epectaptera discosticta Hampson, 1898
 Epectaptera innotata Dognin, 1899
 Epectaptera laudabilis (Druce, 1896)
 Epectaptera metochria Dognin, 1912
 Epectaptera miniata (Rothschild, 1912)
 Epectaptera umbrescens Schaus, 1905

References

Arctiinae